The Museum of Making Music, is a division of the NAMM Foundation of the National Association of Music Merchants, a 501(c)(3) non-profit organization located in Carlsbad, California.  The museum opened to the public on March 5, 2000. Its mission is to "explore the accomplishments and impact of the music products industry through educational and interactive exhibitions and programs and directly connect visitors with hands-on music making."

The museum's exhibits cover three main components of the music industry: making the instruments, providing the instruments, and using the instruments. The museum's galleries feature more than 450 vintage instruments and artifacts, hundreds of audio samples of popular music and a visitors interactive area with live, hands-on instruments, along with Sit 'N Play areas near the end of the main galleries. In addition to its permanent collection, the museum self-curates temporary exhibitions that revolve around a core theme or idea. These exhibitions are on public display at the museum for 6 to 8 months.

During its first 20 years of existence, the museum curated public exhibits about the history of American popular music, the manufacture and retailing of musical instruments and the history of the music products industry from the 1890s to the present day. In 2020, the museum announced they would undergo a major renovation.  The renovation was completed in June 2021.

The museum organizes public events, performances and lectures to entertain, educate and inform audiences about the heritage and benefits of making music.

See also 
 List of music museums

References

External links
Museum of Making Music Web Site
NAMM Foundation
Museum of Making Music YouTube Channel
Museum of Making Music on Flickr
 Yahoo! Travel Reviews and Information

Music museums in California
Museums in San Diego County, California
Museums established in 2000
Mass media museums in the United States
Museum of Making Music
Musical instrument museums